Alun Munslow (1947–2019) was a British historian known for his deconstructionist and postmodernist approach to historiography. He was Professor Emeritus of History and Historical Theory at Staffordshire University. He was also Visiting Professor at the University of Chichester. His argument is that prior to engaging with the past historians need to acknowledge that the past and history do not share the same ontic and epistemic space. He suggests that the past is the time before our perpetual present and 'history' is that range of authored narratives we substitute for it. Munslow suggests that the consequences of this argument are substantial and not the least among them being the situation that we can only engage with the aesthetics of 'historying' because we cannot access the ontic and epistemic nature of the past. The way to avoid that situation is to fuse – or as he argues - the historian should not (con)fuse the past with history. The past is the 'before now' and the past cannot anticipate the future. He accepts that this may seem ironic – and happily it is – the reason being that history is a singularly unprivileged authorial act undertaken in the perpetual present about the ineffable past. He is the author of a number of texts on the philosophy of history including 'Discourse and Culture: The Creation of America, 1870-1920' (1992), 'Deconstructing History' (1997), 'The New History' (2003), 'Narrative and History' (2007, Second Edition 2018), 'The Future of History' (2010), 'A History of History' (2012) and 'Authoring the Past' (2013). He was the UK Founding Co-Editor of the journal 'Rethinking History: The Journal of Theory and Practice' relinquishing its UK Editorship in 2017.

References

Historiographers
Philosophers of history
Postmodernists
Living people
British historians
20th-century British philosophers
Academics of Staffordshire University
1947 births